Chavdar Yankov (born 29 March 1984) is a Bulgarian retired footballer. He played as a midfielder.

Club career
Yankov began his football career as a youth at Slavia Sofia. He made his debut in professional football on 7 September 2001, in a 0–1 loss against Lokomotiv Sofia. In the 2001–02 season, Yankov played in seven matches for Slavia. He started to make his name two years later when he scored six goals in 30 league games and was called to the Bulgarian national team by then coach Hristo Stoichkov.

In summer 2005, Yankov moved to German Bundesliga side Hannover 96, initially on a loan, but made permanent in summer 2007 for a fee of around €1.30 million. In summer 2009, he was loaned to MSV Duisburg.

On 8 January 2010, Yankov joined Ukrainian Premier League club Metalurh Donetsk on a two-and-a-half-year deal. On 13 August 2010, Yankov was loaned out to Russian Premier League club FC Rostov.

In July 2012, Yankov signed as a free agent for his boyhood club Slavia Sofia on a one-year contract.

Yankov retired in 2014 at the age of 30, due to an injury.

International career
Yankov made his debut for Bulgaria in 2004. On 13 October 2004, he scored his first goal for Bulgaria in a 4–1 win against Malta as part of the World Cup 2006 qualification campaign. On 12 October 2010, in the absence of Stilian Petrov, he captained the side for the first time in the 2–0 win against Saudi Arabia in a friendly match.

From 2004 to 2011, Yankov made a total of 48 appearances for his country, scoring 5 goals.

International goals

References

External links

1984 births
Living people
Bulgarian footballers
Bulgarian expatriate footballers
Bulgaria international footballers
First Professional Football League (Bulgaria) players
Bundesliga players
2. Bundesliga players
Ukrainian Premier League players
Russian Premier League players
PFC Slavia Sofia players
Hannover 96 players
MSV Duisburg players
FC Metalurh Donetsk players
FC Rostov players
Expatriate footballers in Germany
Bulgarian expatriate sportspeople in Germany
Expatriate footballers in Ukraine
Bulgarian expatriate sportspeople in Ukraine
Expatriate footballers in Russia
Bulgarian expatriate sportspeople in Russia
Association football midfielders